Dominic Charles Rupert Troulan,  (born 12 December 1962) is a retired British Army officer and former Royal Marine who was awarded the George Cross on 16 June 2017 for his actions during the 2013 Westgate shopping mall attack in Nairobi, Kenya. He was the first civilian recipient of the award in 25 years.

Early life
Troulan was born in Banbury, Oxfordshire, on 12 December 1962.

Military career
Troulan served in the British Armed Forces for 30 years, first in the Royal Marines and subsequently in the British Army. He joined the Royal Marines in June 1979, and fought in the Falklands War with 42 Commando. He later served in Northern Ireland during The Troubles and was decorated on two separate tours. As a sergeant in the Royal Marines, Troulan was awarded the Queen's Gallantry Medal for his "gallant and distinguished services" in 1993.

This was followed by a Queen's Commendation for Valuable Service for a 2002 tour, by which time Troulan was a warrant officer class 1 in the British Army's Parachute Regiment. He received a short-service commission in the rank of captain on 15 April 2002. He was granted an intermediate regular commission in the same rank on 1 January 2005, and was promoted to major on 31 July 2008. On ending active service, he entered the reserve of officers on 31 August 2009.

George Cross
The award to Dominic Troulan was the first George Cross gazetted in 25 years to a civilian, the previous award being the posthumous award to Stewart Guthrie, a New Zealand police sergeant, in 1992. The most recent award to a British civilian was to John Clements in 1976.
The citation for Troulan's award was published in the London Gazette. It concludes, "Troulan had the presence of mind to realise that the terrorists could be hiding among the survivors. Troulan enlisted help and searched the civilians once he had led them to safety, thus ensuring that no terrorists were hiding in their midst.

References

External links
Queen's Birthday Honours: Inspiring stories of bravery in gallantry list
Notes on Civilian Gallantry List June 2017

1962 births
20th-century Royal Marines personnel
British Army personnel of the Iraq War
British military personnel of The Troubles (Northern Ireland)
British Parachute Regiment officers
British Parachute Regiment soldiers
British recipients of the George Cross
Living people
Military personnel from Oxfordshire
Recipients of the Commendation for Valuable Service
Recipients of the Queen's Gallantry Medal
Royal Marines ranks
Royal Navy personnel of the Falklands War